The East Capitol Street-Cardozo Line, designated Route 96, 97, is a daily bus route operated by the Washington Metropolitan Area Transit Authority between Tenleytown-AU station (96) and Washington Union Station (97) of the Red Line of the Washington Metro and Capitol Heights station of the Blue and Silver Lines of the Washington Metro. The line operates every 20-30 minutes at all times. Route 96 trips are roughly 80-90 minutes long, while route 97 trips are roughly 30 minutes long. During peak hours, Route 96 terminates at Stadium-Armory station and is replaced by route 97.

Background

The line provides service through Downtown Washington DC via East Capitol Street for both routes, and Massachusetts Avenue, New Jersey Avenue, U Street, and Wisconsin Avenue for route 96. Route 96 operates daily while route 97 operates during the weekday peak-hours only in both directions. Route 96 terminates at Stadium-Armory station during the weekday peak-hours with service between Stadium Armory and Capitol Heights station replaced by the 97. Route 96 only serves Capitol Heights during the off-peak hours. Select post midnight trips for route 96 would also begin/end at Duke Ellington Bridge while early morning weekend trips will begin at U and 13th Streets NW.

Routes 96 and 97 currently operates out of Andrews Federal Center division. Route 96 use to operate out of Southern Avenue division during the weekdays and Bladensburg division during the weekends and late nights (after 9:00 PM). Prior to 2019, routes 96 and 97 would operate full time out of Bladensburg division with a few trips on the 97 operated by Southern Avenue. The line has also operated out of Northern division at one point.

Route 96 stops

History
Route 96 originally operated as part of the East-Capitol Hill Streetcar Line under the Washington Railway & Electric Company, which began service in 1922. The line originally as Woodley via 29th but was later replaced. Route 96 operated between Duke Ellington Bridge in Northwest and the Capitol Building. The line would operate along Calvert Street, 18th Street, U Street, Florida Avenue, New Jersey Avenue, North Capitol Street, Louisiana Avenue, and Constitution Avenue.

The line was later acquired by the Capital Traction Company and replaced by buses in 1962 operating under DC Transit. WMATA later acquired DC Transit and three other private bus companies that operated throughout the Washington Metropolitan Area and merged them all together to form its own, Metrobus System on February 4, 1973.

On March 27, 1976, 96 was rerouted from the Capitol Building, and instead terminate at the Washington Union Station. Service along Constitution Avenue was discontinued. 

On May 11, 1991, when the U Street station opened, route 96 began serving the newly opened U Street in the middle of its route. No route changes were made during this particular time.

In March, 1995, when routes 40 and 44 were both discontinued, and route 42 was truncated to operate between Mount Pleasant and Metro Center, route 96 was extended from Washington Union Station] to operate to Capitol Heights station, via Stadium–Armory station, District of Columbia General Hospital, and Benning Road station. Route 96 will terminate at Stadium Armory during the weekday peak-hours only. The new routing helped out route D6 and provide additional service between Union Station and Stadium Armory. Route 96 will mainly operate along Massachusetts Avenue and East Capitol Street.

A new route 97 was introduced to operate alongside the 96, except only operating between Union Station and Capitol Heights during the weekday peak-hours along East Capitol Street. Route 97 would operate on a different pathway between Stadium Armory and Union station mostly remaining along East Capitol Street, and turned on 1st Street, Constitution Avenue, and Louisiana Avenue. Route 96 would operate along Massachusetts Avenue to Union station.

Route 97 would directly serve Stadium–Armory while operating both directions, but 96 would only directly serve Stadium–Armory eastbound only. Passengers wishing to board/alight on the 96, were required to do so at DC General Hospital. Also, the 97 would not serve DC General Hospital.  As a result of the changes, the line was renamed the East Capitol Street–Cardozo Line.

On June 24, 2007, 96 was extended from Duke Ellington Bridge, to McLean Gardens, by operating on Calvert Street past Duke Ellington Bridge, then operating via 29th Street NW, Cathedral Avenue NW, Woodley Road NW, Wisconsin Avenue NW, Idaho Avenue NW, and Newark Street NW, in order to replace the segment of routes 90, 92, 93 between Duke Ellington Bridge and McLean Gardens. The changes were to improve on-time performance for routes 90, 92, and 93.

On September 30, 2012, route 96 along with route X3 was extended from McLean Gardens to Tenleytown-AU station adding additional service along Wisconsin Avenue NW from McLean Gardens due to a long-term detour route to accommodate construction of Cathedral Commons in 2012.

In 2014, WMATA proposed to shorten 96 back towards Duke Ellington Bridge and reroute the line along Massachusetts Avenue NE between 11th & East Capitol Streets and Washington Union Station instead of via 1st Street and Louisiana Avenue NW. A new route 98 would replace the 96 routing between Tenleytown-AU station and U Street station for the following reasons.
 Improve reliability of service by operating shorter routes.
 Provide direct peak period service between Capitol Heights and Duke Ellington Bridge.
 Provide a faster more direct routing around the U.S. Capitol.
 Create a better balance of capacity and demand throughout the entire line.

On June 21, 2015, WMATA rerouted route 96 along Massachusetts Avenue between East Capitol Street and 1st Street NE and directly serving Station Park in order to improve reliability of service. Route 97 was unaffected from the changes.

During 2017, WMATA proposed to eliminate 96's segment between McLean Gardens and Tenleytown-AU station as it operates parallel with the 30N, 30S, 31, 33, 37, and H3, H4. The line would terminate back at Cathedral Commons which was its pre-2012 extension. Under the proposal, the turnaround would include one of the following:
Option 1: From northbound Wisconsin Avenue, left on Newark Street to terminal stand on the north side of Newark Street, midblock between Wisconsin and Idaho Avenues NW. Departing the terminal, buses would proceed west on Newark Street, right on Idaho Avenue, right on Wisconsin Avenue NW and resume the current eastbound route.
Option 2: From northbound Wisconsin Avenue, left on Newark Street, left on Idaho Avenue NW to terminal stand midblock on the west side of Idaho Avenue, between Newark and Macomb Streets NW. Departing the terminal, buses would proceed south on Idaho Avenue, left on Macomb Street, right on Wisconsin Avenue NW and resume the current eastbound route.
Option 3: From northbound Wisconsin Avenue, left on Porter Street, left on 38th Street, left on Newark Street NW to terminal stand at Idaho Avenue. Departing the terminal, buses would continue east on Newark Street, right on Wisconsin Avenue NW and resume the current eastbound route. This routing was similar prior to the 2012 extension.

Performance measures for route 96 goes as follows according to WMATA:

During the COVID-19 pandemic, route 96 was reduced to operate on its Saturday schedule and all route 97 service was suspended beginning on March 16, 2020. However on March 18, 2020, the line was further reduced to operate on its Sunday schedule. All 96 weekend service was also suspended beginning on March 21, 2020. Additional service was added on route 96 on August 23, 2020 however route 97 remained suspended.

On September 26, 2020, WMATA proposed to eliminate all route 97 service and replace them with route 96 trips that will operate the full route between Tenleytown station and Capitol Heights station. This was due to low federal funding.

On November 13, 2020, eastbound route 96 trips was changed to operate along New Jersey Avenue NW between 3rd Street and Massachusetts Avenue upon completion of construction on New Jersey Avenue. Service along New York Avenue NW, M Street NW and North Capitol Street NW was discontinued.

In February 2021 due to low federal funding, WMATA proposed to modify the 96 by operating between Union Station and Deanwood station combing portions of the U5, U6, V1, V7, V8, and W4. The line would operate its current routing between Union Station and East Capitol Street & Minnesota Avenue, then it will operate along Ridge Road, Texas Avenue, E Street, Alabama Avenue, H Street/Hanna Place, Benning Road, G Street, Fitch Place, 53rd Street (northbound)/51st Street (southbound), Central Avenue, East Capitol Street, Division Avenue, Eastern Avenue and Minnesota Avenue to Deanwood station serving the Benning Heights neighborhood. Route 97, route 96 service past Union station and service to Capitol Heights station would be eliminated.

References

96